One More may refer to:
 One More (song), a song by Elliphant, featuring MØ
 One More (The Walking Dead), an episode of the television series The Walking Dead
 One More, a song by SG Lewis, featuring Nile Rodgers, from the album Times